Nash Format Publishers is a Ukrainian publishing company based in Kyiv. It focused on non-fiction literature and has a fiction series. The publisher has offered to the Ukrainian readers 300 translations of books, including works by Nobel Prize laureates, The New York Times and The Economist bestsellers. Nash Format publishes both printed books, ebooks and records audiobooks.

History 
Nash Format was established in 2006 by Ukrainian businessmen and philanthropist Vladyslav Kyrychenko. At first, the company operated as an art-agency focused on producing Ukrainian bands, holding festivals, production of merchandise and publishing books. Later Nash Format was transformed into the publishing house.

In 2012 Anton Martynov joined the company as a CEO and in 2013 became a co-owner.

Nash Format Publishers has published around 1,5 mln books, recorded over 200 audiobooks, launched its bookshop and online store, created an app for reading e-books and listening to audiobooks.

The company has set up an extensive distribution network. The network includes more than 800 sales points both online and offline.

Bestsellers 
In 2015 Nash Format was the 7th among the 20 best publishing brands according to Forbes Ukraine.

Nash Format Publishers has made and offered to the Ukrainian readers 300 translations of books: from business and economics to psychology and self-development, biographies and memoirs. Among them such bestsellers as:

My Life And Work by Henry Ford 
Why Nations Fail: The Origins of Power, Prosperity, and Poverty by Daron Acemoglu, James A. Robinson
Atlas Shrugged by Ayn Rand
Civilization: The West and the Rest by Niall Ferguson
The Subtle Art Of Not Giving A F*ck by Mark Manson
A Mind for Numbers: How to Excel at Math and Science (Even If You Flunked Algebra) by Barbara Oakley 
Good to Great: Why Some Companies Make the Leap... and Others Don't by James C. Collins 
The Black Swan: The Impact of the Highly Improbable by Nassim Nicholas Taleb
Freakonomics: A Rogue Economist Explores the Hidden Side of Everything (Freakonomics, #1) by Steven D. Levitt, Stephen J. Dubner 
Nash Format also translated and presented a series of books about great businesses (Nike, Amazon, IKEA, Starbucks, etc).
The company presented to Ukrainian readers novels of Celeste Ng and Kate Atkinson.

Awards 

In 2015 Nash Format was the 7th among the 20 best publishing brands according to Forbes Ukraine.

Audiobooks 
Nash Format Publishers has its recording studio and produces audiobooks. It records classical literature and modern non-fiction. The audiobooks are recorded by famous narrators – radio hosts, actors, etc.

Book store 
Nash Format Publishers has a book store and online store nashformat.ua that offers worldwide delivery.

Club 
Nash Format created its educational platform in Kyiv. It hosts discussions, public talks, book presentations, etc.

Mobile App 

In 2019 Nash Format Publishers launched an application for reading books and listening to audiobooks online and offline. All files are secured. After the purchase users can read and listen to audiobooks online and offline, but it is impossible to download files on the device. It helps to protect files from illegal sharing.

References 

Ukrainian companies established in 2006
Publishing companies of Ukraine
Publishing companies established in 2006
Ukrainian culture